Andrés Franco (born 10 November 1966) is a Cuban judoka. He competed in the men's middleweight event at the 1992 Summer Olympics.

References

1966 births
Living people
Cuban male judoka
Olympic judoka of Cuba
Judoka at the 1992 Summer Olympics
Place of birth missing (living people)
Pan American Games medalists in judo
Pan American Games bronze medalists for Cuba
Judoka at the 1987 Pan American Games
Judoka at the 1991 Pan American Games
Medalists at the 1987 Pan American Games
Medalists at the 1991 Pan American Games
20th-century Cuban people
21st-century Cuban people